Shivpuri (शिवपुरी) Assembly constituency is one of the 230 Vidhan Sabha (Legislative Assembly) constituencies of Madhya Pradesh state in central India. This constituency came into existence in 1951, as Shivpuri Kolaras, one of the 79 Vidhan Sabha constituencies of the erstwhile Madhya Bharat state.

Overview
Shivpuri (constituency number 25) is one of the 5 Vidhan Sabha constituencies located in Shivpuri district. This constituency covers parts of Shivpuri and Pichhore tehsils of the district.

Shivpuri is part of Guna Lok Sabha constituency along with seven other Vidhan Sabha segments, namely, Pichhore and Kolaras in this district, Bamori and Guna in Guna district and Ashok Nagar, Chanderi and Mungaoli in Ashoknagar district.

Members of Legislative Assembly

As Shivpuri - Kolaras constituency of Madhya Bharat-:

As Shivpuri constituency of Madhya Pradesh:

See also
 Shivpuri

References

Shivpuri district
Assembly constituencies of Madhya Pradesh